Liechtenstein sent a delegation to compete at the 2010 Winter Olympics in Vancouver, British Columbia, Canada from 12–28 February 2010.  The delegation consisted of seven athletes, two alpine skiers and five bobsledders.  The Liechtenstein team did not win any medals at this Olympics.

Alpine skiing

Tina Weirather did not compete due to injury suffered on 23 January 2010.

Bobsleigh

Benedikt Lampert (alternate)

The four-man team was forced to withdraw after pilot Michael Klingler began suffering from a recurring concussion problem following the crash in the two-man event.

References

External links
  Preliminary Olympic Qualified Athletes for Liechtenstein

2010 in Liechtenstein sport
Nations at the 2010 Winter Olympics
2010